Enrico Loffredo (1507–1547) was a Roman Catholic prelate who served as Bishop of Capaccio (1531–1547).

Biography
Enrico Loffredo was born in 1507.
On 18 December 1531, he was appointed during the papacy of Pope Clement VII as Bishop of Capaccio.
He served as Bishop of Capaccio until his death in January 1547.

While bishop, he was the principal co-consecrator of Giovanni Maria Canigiani, Auxiliary Bishop of Pistoia and Titular Bishop of Hippos (1540); and Jan Wilamowski, Bishop of Kamyanets-Podilskyi (1540).

References

External links and additional sources
 (for Chronology of Bishops) 
 (for Chronology of Bishops) 

16th-century Italian Roman Catholic bishops
Bishops appointed by Pope Clement VII
1507 births
1547 deaths